This is a list of Japanese films that are scheduled to release in 2021.

Highest-grossing films
The following is a list of the 10 highest-grossing Japanese films released at the Japanese box office during 2021.

Film releases

January – March

April - June

July - September

October - December

Delayed or postponed
Below is a list of films delayed or postponed due to the COVID-19 pandemic in Japan.

See also
 List of 2021 box office number-one films in Japan
 2021 in Japan
 2021 in Japanese television

References

External links
 

Film
2021
Lists of 2021 films by country or language